Big Ballet is a 2014 British documentary program that follows Wayne Sleep and prima ballerina Monica Loughman as they help a troupe of amateur plus-size dancers realize their dream of dancing Swan Lake. The three-episode series, produced by Rare Day and broadcast on Channel 4, premiered on February 6, 2014.

The dancers, referred to in the show as "fat" or "real women", range from UK size 12 to 24 – significantly larger than the norm in classical ballet. Eighteen dancers were selected from a pool of more than 500 applicants to participate in the series.

Big Ballet also features Matthew Bourne, Derek Deane, Patricia Doyle, David Plumpton, Tamara Rojo, David Nixon and the English National Ballet. It was predominantly filmed at the Northern Ballet; its final performance was staged at St George's Hall, Bradford in front of 1,500 people.

Advertisements seeking dancers for the series read: "Have you ever dreamt of being a ballet-dancer but feel your size holds you back? Have you ever imagined dancing on a big stage in front of an adoring crowd? We are looking for talented dancers aged 18-55 to take part in our new series about ballet. No previous ballet experience necessary. If you're interested to hear more, we'd love to talk to you!"

Episodes

Adaptation 

In 2021, an American series based on Big Ballet premiered on Fox called The Big Leap, which ran for one season. The show adapted the premise of Big Ballet into a fictional comedy-drama.

References

External links 
 Big Ballet at Channel 4
 Big Ballet at YouTube
 

2014 British television series debuts
2014 British television series endings
Channel 4 documentaries
2010s British documentary television series
Television shows set in Yorkshire
English-language television shows
Dance television shows